Withnail and I is a 1987 British black comedy film written and directed by Bruce Robinson. Loosely based on Robinson's life in London in the late 1960s, the plot follows two unemployed actors, Withnail and "I" (portrayed by Richard E. Grant and Paul McGann, respectively) who share a flat in Camden Town in 1969. Needing a holiday, they obtain the key to a country cottage in the Lake District belonging to Withnail's eccentric uncle Monty and drive there. The weekend holiday proves less recuperative than they expected.

Withnail and I was Grant's first film and established his profile. The film featured performances by Richard Griffiths as Withnail's Uncle Monty and Ralph Brown as Danny the drug dealer. The film has tragic and comic elements and is notable for its period music and many quotable lines. It has been described as "one of Britain's biggest cult films".

The character "I" is named "Marwood" in the published screenplay but goes unnamed in the film credits.

Plot
In September 1969, two unemployed young actors, flamboyant alcoholic Withnail and contemplative Marwood, live in a messy flat in Camden Town, London. Their only regular visitor is their drug dealer, Danny. One morning, the pair squabble about housekeeping and then leave to take a walk. In Regent's Park, they discuss the poor state of their acting careers and the desire for a holiday; Marwood proposes a trip to a rural cottage near Penrith owned by Withnail's wealthy uncle Monty. They visit Monty that evening at his luxurious Chelsea house. Monty is a melodramatic aesthete, who Marwood infers is homosexual. The three briefly drink together as Withnail casually lies to Monty about his acting career. He further deceives Monty by implying that Marwood attended Eton College, whilst a lithograph of  Harrow School seen earlier in the flat suggests that both Monty and Withnail were educated there. Withnail persuades his uncle to lend them the cottage key and they leave.

Withnail and Marwood drive to the cottage the next day but find the weather cold and wet, the cottage without provisions and the locals unwelcoming—in particular a poacher, Jake, whom Withnail offends in the pub. Marwood becomes anxious when he later sees Jake prowling around the cottage and suggests they leave for London the next day. Withnail in turn demands that they share a bed in the interest of safety but Marwood refuses. During the night, Withnail fears that the poacher wants to harm them and climbs under the covers with Marwood, who angrily leaves for a different bed. Hearing the sounds of an intruder breaking into the cottage, Withnail again joins Marwood in bed. The intruder turns out to be Monty, with supplies.

The next day, Marwood realises Monty's visit has ulterior motives when he makes aggressive sexual advances upon him; Withnail seems oblivious to this. Monty drives them into town and gives them money to buy wellington boots but they go to a pub instead, and then to a small cafe where they cause a disturbance. Monty is hurt, though he forgets the offence as the three drink and play poker. Marwood is terrified by the thought of Monty's further sexual overtures and wants to leave immediately, but Withnail insists on staying. Late in the night, Marwood tries to avoid Monty's company but is eventually cornered in the guest bedroom as Monty demands sex. Monty also reveals that Withnail, during the visit in London, lied that Marwood was a closet homosexual. Marwood lies that Withnail is the closeted one and that the two of them are in a committed relationship, which Withnail wishes to keep secret from his family and that this is the first night in 6 years that they have not slept together. Monty, a romantic, believes this explanation and leaves after apologising for coming between them. In private, Marwood furiously confronts Withnail.

The next morning, they find Monty has left for London, leaving a note wishing them happiness together. They continue to argue. A telegram arrives from Marwood's agent with a possible offer of work and he insists they return. As Marwood sleeps in the car, Withnail drunkenly speeds most of the way back until pulled over by the police who arrest him for driving under the influence. The pair return to the flat to find Danny and a friend named Presuming Ed squatting. Marwood calls his agent and discovers he is wanted for the lead part in a play but will need to move to Manchester to take it. The four share a huge cannabis joint but the celebration ends when Marwood learns they have received an eviction notice for unpaid rent, while Withnail is too high to care. Marwood—with new haircut—packs a bag to leave for the railway station. He turns down Withnail's offer of a goodbye drink, so Withnail walks with him to the station. In Regent's Park, Marwood reciprocates Withnail saying that he will miss him, and then leaves. Alone with bottle of wine in hand, Withnail performs "What a piece of work is a man!" from Hamlet to the wolves in a nearby Zoo enclosure, and then turns to walk home in the rain.

Cast
 Richard E. Grant as Withnail
 Paul McGann as "...& I" (Marwood)
 Richard Griffiths as Monty (Montague H. Withnail)
 Ralph Brown as Danny
 Michael Elphick as Jake
 Daragh O'Malley as Irishman (aggressive pub visitor)
 Michael Wardle as Isaac Parkin (farmer)
 Una Brandon-Jones as Mrs Parkin
 Noel Johnson as General (bar owner)
 Irene Sutcliffe as Waitress
 Llewellyn Rees as Tea Shop Proprietor
 Robert Oates as Policeman 1
 Anthony Wise as Policeman 2
 Eddie Tagoe as Presuming Ed

Production

Development

Writing
The film is an adaptation of an unpublished novel written by Robinson in 1969–1970 (an early draft of which sold at auction for £8,125 in 2015). Actor friend Don Hawkins passed a copy of the manuscript to his friend Mordecai (Mody) Schreiber in 1980. Schreiber paid Robinson £20,000 to adapt it into a screenplay, which Robinson did in the early 1980s. When meeting Schreiber in Los Angeles, Robinson expressed concern that he might not be able to continue because the writing broke basic screenplay rules and was hard to make work as a film. It used colloquial English to which few Americans would connect ("Give me a tanner and I'll give him a bell."); characters in dismal circumstances and a plot prodded by uncinematic voice-overs. Schreiber told him that that was precisely what he wanted. On completing the script, producer Paul Heller urged Robinson to direct it and found funding for half the film. The script was then passed to HandMade Films and George Harrison agreed to fund the remainder of the film.
Robinson's script is largely autobiographical. "Marwood" is Robinson; "Withnail" is based on Vivian MacKerrell, a friend with whom he shared a Camden house and "Uncle Monty" is loosely based on Franco Zeffirelli, from whom Robinson received unwanted amorous attentions when he was a young actor. He lived in the impoverished conditions seen in the film and wore plastic bags as Wellington boots. For the script, Robinson condensed two or three years of his life into two or three weeks. Robinson stated he named the character of Withnail after a childhood acquaintance named Jonathan Withnall, who was "the coolest guy I had ever met in my life".

Early in the film, Withnail reads a newspaper headline "Boy Lands Plum Role for Top Italian Director" and suggests that the director is sexually abusing the boy. This is a reference to the sexual harassment that Robinson alleges he suffered at the hands of Zeffirelli when, at age 21, he won the role of Benvolio in Romeo and Juliet. Robinson attributed Uncle Monty's question to Marwood ("Are you a sponge or a stone?") as a direct quote from Zeffirelli. The headline "NUDE AU PAIR'S SECRET LIFE" was an actual headline from News of the World on 16 November 1969.

The end of the novel saw Withnail dying by suicide by pouring a bottle of wine into the barrel of Monty's shotgun and then pulling the trigger as he drank from it. Robinson changed the ending, as he believed it was "too dark".

Name of "I"

While the name of "I" is never spoken in the film, in the screenplay it is "Marwood". The name "Marwood" is used by Robinson in interviews and in writing as well as by Grant and McGann in the 1999 Channel 4 documentary short Withnail and Us. The name "Marwood" was known to film critic Vincent Canby of the New York Times in a 27 March 1987 review coinciding with the film's New York premiere at the New Directors/New Films series at the Museum of Modern Art. In the supplemental material packaged with the Special Edition DVD in the UK, McGann's character is referred to as Peter Marwood in the cast credits.

It has been suggested that it is possible that 'Marwood' can be heard near the beginning of the film: As the characters escape from the Irishman in the Mother Black Cap, Withnail shouts "Get out of my way!". Some hear this line as "Out of the way, Marwood!", although the script reads simply "Get out of my way!".

Although the first name of "I" is not stated anywhere in the film, it is widely believed that it is "Peter". This myth arose as a result of a line of misheard dialogue. In the scene where Monty meets the two actors, Withnail asks him if he would like a drink. In his reply, Monty both accepts his offer and says "...you must tell me all the news, I haven't seen you since you finished your last film". While pouring another drink, and downing his own, Withnail replies that he has been "Rather busy uncle. TV and stuff". Then pointing at Marwood he says "He's just had an audition for rep". Some hear this line as "Peter'''s had an audition for rep", although the original shooting script and all commercially published versions of the script read "he's".

Towards the end of the film, a telegram arrives at Crow Crag on which the name "Marwood" is partially visible.

Pre-production
Peter Frampton worked as make-up artist, Sue Love as hair stylist and Andrea Galer worked as costume designer.

Casting
Mary Selway worked as casting director.

Paul McGann was Robinson's first choice for "I" but he was fired during rehearsals because Robinson decided McGann's Scouse (Liverpool) accent was wrong for the character. Several other actors read for the role but McGann eventually persuaded Robinson to re-audition him, promising to affect a Home Counties accent and quickly won back the part.

Actors Robinson considered for "Withnail" included Daniel Day-Lewis, Bill Nighy, Kenneth Branagh, and Edward Tudor-Pole. Robinson claims that Richard E. Grant was too fat to play Withnail and told him that "half of you has got to go". Grant has denied this.

Though he played a raging alcoholic, Grant is a teetotaller with an allergy to alcohol. He had never been drunk prior to making the film. Robinson decided that it would be impossible for Grant to play the character without having ever experienced inebriation and a hangover, so he "forced" the actor on a drinking binge. Grant has stated that he was "violently sick" after each drink and found the experience deeply unpleasant.

Filming

According to Richard E. Grant's book, With Nails, filming started on 2 August 1986 in the Lake District and shooting took seven weeks. A rough cut was screened to the actors in a Wardour Street screening room on 8 December 1986. Denis O'Brien, who oversaw the filming on behalf of HandMade Films, nearly shut the film down on the first day of production. He thought that the film had no "discernible jokes" and was badly lit. During the filming of the scene in which Withnail drinks a can of lighter fluid, Robinson changed the contents of the can between takes from water to vinegar to get a better reaction from Grant. The film cost £1.1 million to make. Robinson received £80,000 to direct, £30,000 of which he reinvested into the film to shoot additional scenes such as the journeys to and from Penrith, which HandMade Films would not fund. The money was never reimbursed after the film's success. Ringo Starr is credited as a "Special Production Consultant" under his legal name, Richard Starkey MBE.

Cumbria
The film was shot almost entirely on location. There was no filming in the real Penrith; the locations used were in and around nearby Shap and Bampton, Cumbria. Monty's cottage, "Crow Crag", is Sleddale Hall, near the Wet Sleddale Reservoir just outside Shap, although the lake that "Crow Crag" apparently overlooks is Haweswater Reservoir. The bridge where Withnail and Marwood go fishing with a shotgun is over the River Lowther. The telephone box in which Withnail calls his agent is beside Wideworth Farm Road in Bampton.

Sleddale Hall was offered for sale in January 2009 with a starting price of £145,000. Sebastian Hindley, who owns the Mardale Inn in Bampton, won the auction at a price of £265,000 but he failed to secure financing and the property was resold for an undisclosed sum to Tim Ellis, an architect from Kent, whose original bid failed at the auction.

Hertfordshire
Exterior and ground floor interior shots of Crow Crag were shot at Sleddale Hall and Stockers Farm in Rickmansworth, though the bedroom and stair scenes of Crow Crag were filmed in Hertfordshire. Stockers Farm was also the location for the "Crow and Crown" pub.

Buckinghamshire

The "King Henry" pub and the "Penrith Tea Rooms" scenes were filmed in the Market Square in Stony Stratford, Milton Keynes, Buckinghamshire, at what is now The Crown Inn Stony Stratford and Cox & Robinson pharmacy, respectively.

London
Withnail and Marwood's flat was located at 57 Chepstow Place in Bayswater, W2. The shot of them leaving for Penrith as they turn left from the building being demolished was shot on Freston Road, W11. "The Mother Black Cap" pub was played by "The Frog and Firkin" pub at 41 Tavistock Crescent, Westbourne Green, Notting Hill. For some time after the film, the pub was renamed "The Mother Black Cap", though it was sold and renamed several times before being demolished in 2010–2011. The cafe where Marwood has breakfast at the beginning of the film is located at the corner of 136 Lancaster Road, W11 near the corner with Ladbroke Grove. The scene where the police order Withnail and Marwood to "get in the back of the van" was filmed on the flyover near John Aird Court, Paddington. Uncle Monty's house is actually the West House, Glebe Place, Chelsea, SW3, owned by Bernard Nevill.

Shepperton Studios
The police station interior was shot at Shepperton Studios.

Reception
Bruce Robinson won the Best Screenplay award at the 1988 Evening Standard British Film Awards.

In 1999, the British Film Institute voted Withnail and I the 29th greatest British film of all time. A 2009 poll by The Guardian among film critics and filmmakers about the best British films of the last 25 years voted it in second place. In 2017 a poll of 150 actors, directors, writers, producers and critics for Time Out magazine, the film was ranked the 15th best British film ever. The line "We want the finest wines available to humanity, we want them here and we want them now", delivered by Richard E. Grant as Withnail, was voted the third favourite film one-liner in a 2003 poll of 1,000 film fans.

In 2000, readers of Total Film voted Withnail and I the third greatest comedy film of all time. In 2004 the same magazine named it the 13th greatest British film of all time. In 2001, Withnail and I was 38th in Channel 4's 100 Greatest Films poll. In a 2014 poll, readers of Empire voted Withnail and I the 92nd greatest film.

On review aggregator Rotten Tomatoes, the film has an approval rating of 92% based on 37 reviews, with an average rating of 8.50/10. The website's critical consensus reads, "Richard E. Grant and Paul McGann prove irresistibly hilarious as two misanthropic slackers in Withnail and I, a biting examination of artists living on the fringes of prosperity and good taste." In August 2009 The Observer polled 60 eminent British film filmmakers and film critics who voted it the second best British film of the last 25 years. The film was also ranked number 118 in Empire's 500 Greatest Films of all Time list. In a four-star review, film critic Roger Ebert added the film to his "Great Movies" list, describing Grant's performance as a "tour de force" and Withnail as "one of the iconic figures in modern films".

In 2007 a digitally remastered version of the film was released by the UK Film Council. It was shown at over fifty cinemas around the UK on 11 September, as part of the final week of the BBC's "Summer of British Film" season. In 2011, Time Out London named it the 7th-greatest comedy film of all time.

Legacy
The film is routinely regarded as being among the finest British movies ever made, and its influence has been cited by several filmmakers, including directly inspiring: Shane Black's The Nice Guys, James Ponsoldt's The End of the Tour, Todd Sklar's Awful Nice, Jay and Mark Duplass's Jeff, Who Lives at Home, John Bryant's The Overbrook Brothers, David Gordon Green's Pineapple Express, Alexander Payne's Sideways, and Tom DiCillo's Box of Moonlight.

There is a drinking game associated with the film. The game consists of keeping up, drink for drink, with each alcoholic substance consumed by Withnail over the course of the film. All told, Withnail is shown drinking roughly  glasses of red wine,  of cider, one shot of lighter fluid (vinegar or overproof rum are common substitutes),  measures of gin, six glasses of sherry, thirteen drams of Scotch whisky and  pint of ale.

In 1992, filmmaker David Fincher attempted to create an unofficial reunion of sorts, when he tried casting all three of the film's main characters in Alien 3. McGann and Brown appeared, however Richard E. Grant turned down his role. It eventually went to Charles Dance, who played the character of Clemens in the "spirit of Withnail".

In 1996, the Los Angeles Times reported the film (and the associated drinking game) had achieved cult status prior to its home video re-release in the United States.

In 2010, McGann said that he sometimes meets viewers who believe the film was actually shot in the 1960s, saying "It comes from the mid-1980s, but it sticks out like a Smiths record. Its provenance is from a different era. None of the production values, none of the iconography, none of the style remotely has it down as an 80s picture."

Soundtrack
Original music for the film was composed by David Dundas and Rick Wentworth.

The film features a rare appearance of a recording by the Beatles, whose 1968 song "While My Guitar Gently Weeps" plays as Withnail and Marwood return to London and find Presuming Ed in the bath. The song, which was written and sung by George Harrison, was able to be included in the soundtrack due to Harrison's involvement in the film as one of the producers.

Tracklist
 "A Whiter Shade of Pale" (live)King Curtis5:25
 "The Wolf"David Dundas and Rick Wentworth1:33
 "All Along the Watchtower" (reduced tempo)The Jimi Hendrix Experience4:10
 "To the Crow"David Dundas and Rick Wentworth2:22
 "Voodoo Child (Slight Return)" (live)The Jimi Hendrix Experience4:28
 "While My Guitar Gently Weeps"The Beatles4:44
 "Marwood Walks"David Dundas and Rick Wentworth2:14
 "Monty Remembers"David Dundas and Rick Wentworth2:02
 "La Fite"David Dundas and Rick Wentworth1:10
 "Hang Out the Stars in Indiana"Al Bowlly and New Mayfair Dance Orchestra1:35
 "Crow Crag"David Dundas and Rick Wentworth0:56
 "Cheval Blanc"David Dundas and Rick Wentworth1:15
 "My Friend"Charlie Kunz1:28
 "Withnail's Theme"David Dundas and Rick Wentworth2:40

See also
 BFI Top 100 British films

Notes

References

Further reading
 Simon Barnes, "Withnail and Him," The Anthony Powell Newsletter 88 (Autumn 2022): 8–11.
 Ali Catterall and Simon Wells, Your Face Here: British Cult Movies Since The Sixties (Fourth Estate, 2001) 
 Richard E. Grant, With Nails: The Film Diaries of Richard E. Grant (Picador, 1996) 
 Kevin Jackson, Withnail & I (BFI, 2004) 
 Alistair Owen (editor), Smoking in Bed: Conversations with Bruce Robinson (Bloomsbury, 2000) 
 Bruce Robinson, Withnail & I: The Original Screenplay (Bloomsbury, 1995) 
 Maisie Robson, Withnail and the Romantic Imagination: A Eulogy'' (King's England Press, 2010)

External links

 
 
 
 
 
 Withnail and I an essay by Bruce Robinson at the Criterion Collection, from the introduction of the 10th anniversary publication of the screenplay
 Image gallery on BBC Cumbria
 Filming Locations for Withnail & I
 Withnail & I – 25 Years On
 
 

1987 films
1987 comedy-drama films
1987 independent films
British comedy-drama films
British LGBT-related films
Films directed by Bruce Robinson
British black comedy films
British buddy comedy-drama films
Films about actors
Films about alcoholism
Films set in the Lake District
Films set in London
Films set in 1969
1987 LGBT-related films
Films shot in England
Films shot in London
British independent films
HandMade Films films
Films set in country houses
1987 directorial debut films
1980s English-language films
1980s British films